A yacht ensign is a flag allowed by some nations to be hoisted as the national ensign (instead of the civil ensign)  by yachts.

As  with any other civil ensign, the yacht ensign is the largest flag on board, and is normally flown at the stern (rear) of the ship. 

Yacht ensigns differ from merchant ensigns in that their use indicates that the yacht is not carrying any cargo which requires a customs declaration. Carrying commercial cargo on a boat with a yacht ensign is deemed to be smuggling in many jurisdictions.

References

Ensigns
Yachting
Lists and galleries of flags